The Skirmish at Ashley's Mill, also known as the Skirmish at Ferry Landing was an engagement that was fought between Union Army and Confederate States Army cavalry regiments in Arkansas on September 7, 1863 during the American Civil War. Union Brigadier-General John W. Davidson commanding the cavalry division of the Union Army of Arkansas sent the 7th Missouri Volunteer Cavalry Regiment as his lead regiment to clear the 5th Arkansas Cavalry Regiment, under the temporary command of Major John Bull while Colonel Robert C. Newton was in temporary brigade command, from its position guarding a crossing of the Arkansas River near Little Rock, Arkansas. The Union cavalry forced the Confederates to retreat which opened the route to the east of the river, leading to the Battle of Bayou Fourche on September 10, 1863 and the capture of Little Rock by the Union Army of Arkansas under the command of Major General Frederick Steele. The Confederate regiment's casualties were 1 killed, 3 wounded and 2 captured while the Union regiment reported no casualties.

References
"Skirmish at Ferry Landing" in Encyclopedia of Arkansas.

Ashley
Conflicts in 1863
1863 in Arkansas
Ashley
September 1863 events